Laura Mertens (born 25 May 1993) is a German freestyle wrestler. She won one of the bronze medals in the 58 kg event at the 2017 European Wrestling Championships held in Novi Sad, Serbia.

Career 

In 2010, she competed in the girls' freestyle 46 kg event at the Summer Youth Olympics without winning a medal. She lost her bronze medal match against Petra Olli of Finland. In 2013, she competed in the women's 55 kg event at the European Wrestling Championships held in Tbilisi, Georgia where she was eliminated in her second match by Emese Barka of Hungary.

In 2020, she competed in the women's 57 kg event at the Individual Wrestling World Cup held in Belgrade, Serbia where she was eliminated in the repechage by Alyona Kolesnik of Azerbaijan. In March 2021, she competed at the European Qualification Tournament in Budapest, Hungary hoping to qualify for the 2020 Summer Olympics in Tokyo, Japan. She was eliminated in her second match by Johanna Lindborg of Sweden. She also failed to qualify for the Olympics at the World Olympic Qualification Tournament held in Sofia, Bulgaria.

Major results

References

External links 
 

Living people
1993 births
Place of birth missing (living people)
German female sport wrestlers
Wrestlers at the 2010 Summer Youth Olympics
European Wrestling Championships medalists
21st-century German women